Grom (Russian: Гром) was one of eight s built for the Russian Imperial Navy during World War I. Completed in 1916, she served with the Baltic Fleet and was sunk on 14 October 1917 during the Battle of Moon Sound.

Bibliography 
 
 

Orfey-class destroyers
Destroyers of the Imperial Russian Navy
Ships built in Russia
1915 ships
World War I destroyers of Russia